Mont may refer to:

Places
 Mont., an abbreviation for Montana, a U.S. state
 Mont, Belgium (disambiguation), several places in Belgium
 Mont, Hautes-Pyrénées, a commune in France
 Mont, Pyrénées-Atlantiques, a commune in France
 Mont, Saône-et-Loire, a commune in France

Other uses
 Mont (food), a category of Burmese snacks and desserts
 Mont (surname)
 Mont., botanical author abbreviation of Camille Montagne (1784-1866), French military physician and botanist  
 Seawise Giant, the largest ship in the world, later renamed MV Mont for her final journey
 Menthu or Mont, a deity in Egyptian mythology
 M.O.N.T, South Korean boy group

See also
 Le Mont (disambiguation)
 Monts (disambiguation)
 Monte (disambiguation)